The Simpsons Pinball Party is a 2003 pinball game released by Stern Pinball.

Content
The Simpsons Pinball Party is based on the animated sitcom The Simpsons that airs on the Fox network. The game is said to feature one of the most complex rule sheets that has ever been designed for a pinball machine featuring the ability to stack various modes and multi-balls on top of each other. Reaching the "Super Duper Mega Extreme Wizard Mode" requires an unusually large number of shots and only a few people have ever reached it.

Development and release
The game is the successor to the first Simpsons pinball game, entitled The Simpsons, which was released by Data East Pinball (the predecessor to Stern Pinball) in 1990. In 2007, Stern Pinball president Gary Stern  said in an interview with License! that "We first licensed The Simpsons for pinball in the early '90s, when we were Data East Pinball. While we export about one-third of our games, that first model did especially well in the U.S." He went on to say that more than a decade later, "we started to manufacture a totally new game, The Simpsons Pinball Party. We coordinated with Fox and The Simpsons folks who did the art for the game, as well as the actors who voiced the speech heard during gameplay. We then made an initial production run, totaling thousands [...]".  

The pinball game was released in 2003. Keith Johnson, software designer on Pinball Party said around that time that "In the last 12 years, both pinball and The Simpsons have come a long way, and it was my goal to design a game that illustrates that perfectly. Casual players will be attracted to the Simpsons license and the compelling gadgets. Regular players will be astounded by the sheer amount of things to do and accomplish on the game. I think players of all kinds will be drawn in and find the game satisfying regardless of their skill level."  According to Stern, the pinball game is one of Stern Pinball's "largest and most successful titles."

References

External links
Official webpage

Recent Auction Results for The Simpsons Pinball Party

Simpsons Pinball Party
Stern pinball machines
2003 pinball machines
Pinball
Pinball machines based on television series
Television